The 2003 Nigerian Senate election in Lagos State was held on April 12, 2003, to elect members of the Nigerian Senate to represent Lagos State. Musiliu Obanikoro representing Lagos Central, Tokunbo Afikuyomi representing Lagos West and Adeleke Mamora representing Lagos East all won on the platform of the Alliance for Democracy.

Overview

Summary

Results

Lagos Central 
The election was won by Musiliu Obanikoro of the Alliance for Democracy.

Lagos West 
The election was won by Tokunbo Afikuyomi of the Alliance for Democracy.

Lagos East 
The election was won by Adeleke Mamora of the Alliance for Democracy.

References 

April 2003 events in Nigeria
Lagos State Senate elections
Lag